Jordan Smith (born August 31, 1979) is an American rower, rowing coach, and teacher.

Smith was born in 1979. He was a member of the US national rowing team, competing at the 2005 World Rowing Championships. Jordan Smith graduated from Georgia Tech. He is currently the Women's Head Coach for the Atlanta Junior Rowing Association in Roswell, Georgia.

He used to be the head coach for the rowing team at Emory University in Atlanta, Georgia. While he is not rowing or coaching, he teaches science classes including AP Physics at Johns Creek High School and won teacher of the month at Johns Creek High School in 2016 and teacher of the year in 2018.

As of August 2019, he is now a retired rowing coach and now one of the coaches for the Johns Creek High School Cross Country Team while still being a physics teacher at Johns Creek High School.

References 

Living people
1979 births
American male rowers
Georgia Tech Yellow Jackets rowers
Emory Eagles rowing coaches
World Rowing Championships medalists for the United States